Adolphe Guénée (14 December 1818 in Paris – 16 July 1877 in Paris) was a 19th-century French playwright.

The son of a conductor of the Théâtre du Palais-Royal, he studied in College Bourbon and made his debut in 1838 at the Théâtre de la Gaîté.

Director of the theater district of Caen, his plays were presented on the most significant Parisian stages of his time including the Théâtre des Folies-Dramatiques, the Théâtre des Délassements-Comiques, and the Théâtre du Palais-Royal.

Works 

 L'Orphelin du parvis Notre-Dame ou la Jeunesse de d'Alembert, comédie-vaudeville in 1 act, 1838
 La France et l'industrie, vaudeville allégorique in 1 act, à propos de l'exposition des produits de 1839, with Pierre Tournemine, 1839
 Les Guerres de Paris, vaudeville populaire in 3 acts, with Tournemine, 1839
 Une Mauvaise plaisanterie, vaudeville in 1 act, with Jules Brésil, 1839
 Tiennette ou le racoleur et la jeune fille, vaudeville in 1 act, with Alexandre Ferré, 1839
 L'Inondation de Lyon, épisode des désastres du Midi, in 2 acts and 3 tableaux, 1840
 Le Bijoutier de Nuremberg, ou : Elle me console, drama in 3 acts, with Potier, 1840
 La Femme de l'émigré, drama in 2 acts mingled with songs, with Georges Fath, 1840
 Les Gueux de Paris, épisode de 1625, vaudeville populaire in 3 acts, with Tournemine, 1841
 1842 à l'hôtel Bullion, revue in 1 act mingled with couplets, with Auguste Jouhaud, 1842
 Les Enfants peints par eux-mêmes, revue-vaudeville in 1 act, with Alexandre Auguste de Berruyer, 1842
 La Fille du ciel ; preceded by l'Ile des lutins, prologue in 1 act, with Clairville, 1843
 L'Histoire des écoles, review of seven centuries in 6 acts and 10 parts, with Tournemine, 1843
 Les Jolies filles du Maroc, three-act play, mingled with couplets, with Louis Couailhac and Alfred Desroziers, 1844
 L'Oiseau de paradis, féerie play in 3 acts and 14 tableaux, with Couailhac and Desroziers, 1846
 O'Néa, ou Taïti et Versailles, play in 3 acts mingled with song, with Couailhac, 1847
 Le Président d'Entrecasteaux ou le parlement et les Jésuites, scène historique du XVIIIe siècle (1773-1784), 1847
 La Reine Argot, parodie de La Reine Margot by Alexandre Dumas, in 3 acts, 7 tableaux and in verse, with Marc Leprévost and Lubize, 1847
 23 et 24 février ou le Réveil du peuple, patriotic picture in 1 act between two barricades, with Leprévost and Jouhaud, 1848
 Un Voyage en Icarie, à-propos in 1 act, mingled with couplets, 1848
 La Graine de mousquetaires, vaudeville in 5 acts, with Paul de Kock, 1849
 Rhum, à propos mêlé de couplets, with Clairville and Leprévost, 1849
 Gâchis et poussière, revue in 3 acts and 12 tableaux, with Delacour, 1850
 Voilà le plaisir, mesdames !, revue in 4 acts and 16 tableaux, with Delacour, 1851
 Le Porte-drapeau d'Austerlitz, drame in 1 act, mingled with song, 1852
 Les Variétés de 1852, revue-féerie in 4 acts and 12 tableaux, followed by the 2999e presentation of la Femme aux camélias, parody in 1 act, with Delacour and Lambert-Thiboust, 1852
 Une Femme qui se grise, vaudeville in 1 act, with Alfred Delacour and Lambert-Thiboust, 1853
 Un Gendre en mi-bémol, folie-vaudeville in 1 act, with Alexandre Flan, 1853
 L'Alma, à propos patriotique mingled with couplets, in 1 tableaux, with Amédée de Jallais, 1854
 La Fille du feu, féerie in 3 acts and 8 tableaux, with Monnier, 1854
 La Queue de la comète, revue of the year 1853, in 3 acts and 4 tableaux, with Eugène Cormon and Eugène Grangé, 1854
 Les Toiles du Nord, parodie de l'Étoile du Nord, in 3 acts and 4 tableaux, preceded by Devant le rideau, prologue, with Monnier and Flan, 1854
 Voilà ce qui vient de paraître, revue of the year 1854, in 3 acts et 16 tableaux, avec Potier, 1854
 La Dame aux trois maris, vaudeville in 1 act, with Potier, 1855
 L'Enfant du petit monde, vaudeville in 3 acts, with Potier, 1855
 Dzing ! Boum ! Boum !, revue de l'Exposition in 3 acts and 16 tableaux, with Potier and Eugène Mathieu, 1855
 La Vivandière des zouaves, monologue-vaudeville in 1 act, 1855
 Allons-y gaiment, revue of the year 1856, in 3 acts and 14 tableaux, with Charles Potier, 1856
 Les Dragées du 16 mars, à-propos mingled with couplets, with Potier, 1856
 Si j'étais riche, comédie vaudeville in 1 act, with Potier, 1856
 Vous allez voir ce que vous allez voir, revue of the year 1855, n 3 acts and 16 tableaux, with Potier, 1856
 Les Délassements à la belle-étoile, prologue d'ouverture in 2 tableaux, with Albert Monnier, 1857
 Le Premier feu, vaudeville in 1 act, with Potier, 1857
 En avant, marche !, revue of the year 1857, in 3 acts and 16 tableaux. La Guerre des saisons, prologue, with Potier, 1857
 Dans une cave, vaudeville in 1 act, with Jules Renard, 1858
 Le Marquis de Carabas, vaudeville in 1 act, with Théodore Faucheur, 1858
 Tout Paris y passera, revue of the 1858, in 3 acts and 14 tableaux, preceded by Paris sur scène, prologue, with Potier, 1858
 L'Aveugle de Bagnolet, drame-vaudeville in 3 acts, with Charles Deslys, 1859
 Huis-clos, comedy in 1 act, with Adolphe Marquet and Charles Lecocq, 1859
 Monsieur Croquemitaine, comedy mingled with song, with Faucheur, 1860
 L'Œuf de Pâques, ou le Billet à ordre, comedy mingled with song, with Faucheur, 1860
 Le 16 décembre, dramatic and lyrical scene performed on the Grand Theatre Ghent on the occasion of the birthday of His Majesty King Leopold I December 14, 1860, with Albert Vizentini, 1860
 La Routine et le progrès, Opening prologue mingled with couplets, 1861
 Tout Rouen y passera, et la Bouille aussi, great fairy-review of Rouen in 5 acts and 24 tables, extravaganza, 1864
 Bobino vit encore, revue in 3 acts and 10 tableaux, 1866
 La Fée aux amourettes, comédie-vaudeville in 5 acts, with de Kock, 1867
 Deucalion et Pyrrha, pastorale mythologique, with Clairville, 1870
 Antoine et Cléopâtre, operetta in 1 act, 1876
 Sébastopol, à propos patriotique, with de Jallais, undated

Bibliography 
 Gustave Vapereau, Dictionnaire universel des contemporains, 1861,  
 La Grande encyclopédie, inventaire raisonné des sciences, des lettres et des arts, vol.19, 1886, 
 Le Temps n°5935  18 July 1877 (obituary)

19th-century French dramatists and playwrights
1818 births
Writers from Paris
1877 deaths